Ubaldo Rodríguez (born 24 December 1957) is a Puerto Rican wrestler. He competed in two events at the 1988 Summer Olympics.

References

1957 births
Living people
Puerto Rican male sport wrestlers
Olympic wrestlers of Puerto Rico
Wrestlers at the 1988 Summer Olympics
Place of birth missing (living people)